Viktor Grigoryevich Mikhailov (born 1 April 1936) is a Russian politician who served as the first Governor (Head) of Magadan Oblast from 1991 to 1996.

Biography
Viktor Mikhailov was born on 1 April 1936 in Kuvandyk, in Orenburg Oblast. From January to November 1996, he was a Member of the Federation Council, member of the Committee on Budget, Tax Policy, Financial, Currency and Customs Regulation.

References

1936 births
Living people
Russian politicians
Governors of Magadan Oblast
People from Orenburg Oblast
Russian Presidential Academy of National Economy and Public Administration alumni
Members of the Federation Council of Russia (1996–2000)